Baba Malick N'Diaye (born 3 September 1983 in Cordina) is a Senegalese born naturalized Qatari footballer, who currently plays for Al-Kharaitiyat as a goalkeeper.

Club career statistics
Statistics accurate as of 21 August 2011

1Includes Emir of Qatar Cup.
2Includes Sheikh Jassem Cup.
3Includes AFC Champions League.

International career
He is also player of the Qatar national football team and was nominated among the Asian Football Confederation Players of the Year 2009.

External links

References

1983 births
Living people
Qatari footballers
Qatar international footballers
Umm Salal SC players
Lekhwiya SC players
Al-Shamal SC players
Al Kharaitiyat SC players
Association football goalkeepers
Qatar Stars League players
Qatari Second Division players
Senegalese emigrants to Qatar
Naturalised citizens of Qatar
Qatari people of Senegalese descent